AllMyNotes Organizer is an outliner application for Windows, and it allows you to store all documents and notes in a single storage file. Documents are organized in a hierarchical tree representation for quick browsing by topic. A portable version which can be installed on a USB flashdrive, iPod, or removable hard disk drive which can be used on any PC without the need to be installed is also available.

Features
 Organization - Notes can be organized with hierarchy boxes.
 Projecting - The user may assign check boxes and priorities to all items in the hierarchy.
 System tray menu - Allows the user to quickly capture clipboard content (documents and pictures), and to search data stored in the application.
 Global search - Searches in all notes. Advanced Google-like query language is supported.
 Password protection of data file and separate folders.
 Skins - Installation pack includes 16 skins.
 Alarm, Strong Password Generator and Spell Checker features.
 Icons - 56 icons available to assign to folders and notes. Icons are skin-dependent.
 Files and pictures can be attached to Notes in Rich Text Format edit control.
 Multilingual - Available in English, Spanish, French, Swedish, Italian, Korean, Polish, Dutch, Greek, Hungarian, Russian, Ukrainian, Bulgarian, Slovenian, Croatian, Czech, Turkish, Mainland Simplified Chinese, Taiwan Simplified Chinese, Traditional Chinese and Amharic.

File formats
All data is stored locally in a single .ddb database file, encrypted at binary level using an 1800-bit encryption key. File access can be password restricted.

 Import- Notes can be imported from .rtf, .txt, .csv, .knt (KeyNote), and .enex (Evernote), and .html documents, and pictures can be imported from .jpg, .png, .gif, and .bmp files.
 Export- Notes can be exported to .rtf, .txt, and .html documents.

Interface
The interface is functional and simple with a skinned, multilingual interface. The interface also contains a customizable toolbar. The work area is divided into two panels. The left-hand panel displays the hierarchy tree of documents, and the right-hand panel displays the contents of the currently selected item in the hierarchy. It has a rich-text edit control for notes and a folder preview with thumbnails of documents if a folder is selected.

Versions, Editions, License
 Portable version is available for users who need to use AllMyNotes Organizer on multiple PCs, can be installed on USB stick or any other kind of removable media.
 Free and Deluxe editions available. Free edition is freeware. Deluxe edition has number of extended features compared to Free editions.

See also (external link): Comparison Table for Free and Deluxe Editions

Milestones
 30 January 2017 - Release of version 3
 5 August 2010 - Release of version 2
 30 November 2009 - Portable version is released. Version 1.15
 20 November 2009 - Final Release of AllMyNotes Organizer. Version 1

System requirements
 Windows 11, 10, 8, 7, Vista, XP. Works on Linux and Mac if Wine environment is installed.

See also
 Comparison of notetaking software
Lists of outliners for
desktops
mobile devices
web-based

External links 
 AllMyNotes Organizer Homepage
 AllMyNotes Organizer Discussion on FileForum
 AllMyNotes Organizer on Softpedia

Reviews 
 AllMyNotes Organizer Review by Softpedia
 AllMyNotes Organizer Review in The Northern Echo
 AllMyNotes Organizer Review on FrostApps
 AllMyNotes Organizer Review on Free Downloads Center
 An article about AllMyNotes Organizer review on SoftGeek Blog
 AllMyNotes Organizer review on Ghacks Technology News
 AllMyNotes Organizer on Completely Free Software

Note-taking software
Personal information managers
Outliners